Şamlı (also, Shamly) is a village and municipality in the Qabala Rayon of Azerbaijan.  It has a population of 345.

References 

Populated places in Qabala District